Allium giganteum, common name giant onion, is an Asian species of onion, native to central and southwestern Asia but cultivated in many countries as a flowering garden plant.

In early to midsummer, small globes of intense purple umbels appear, followed by attractive fruiting umbels.  A popular cultivar, 'Globemaster', is shorter but produces much larger, deep violet, umbels. Both varieties have been granted the Royal Horticultural Society's Award of Garden Merit.

In nature, the species is found in Iran, Afghanistan, Turkey, Turkmenistan, Tajikistan, and Uzbekistan. In cultivation in the US, it performs well in USDA hardiness zones 6–10.

Eating flowers, seeds, leaves, and stems can cause nausea, vomiting, and diarrhea due to the sulfides they contain.

References

giganteum
Garden plants of Asia
Flora of temperate Asia
Onions
Plants described in 1883
Taxa named by Eduard August von Regel